JSS Academy of Higher Education & Research, formerly Jagadguru Sri Shivarathreeshwara University or JSS University, is an institute of higher education deemed to be university located in Mysore, Karnataka, India. It was established in 2008 and is part of JSS Mahavidyapeetha, which runs a variety of educational institutions. JSS Academy of Higher Education & Research is focused on medical and health-related studies, and comprises of JSS Medical College, JSS Dental College and Hospital and JSS College of Pharmacy at the main campus in Mysore as well as JSS College of Pharmacy in Ootacamund, in the neighbouring state of Tamil Nadu.

Colleges and Departments
Faculty of Medicine – JSS Medical College & Hospital
Faculty of Dentistry – JSS Dental College & Hospital
Faculty of Pharmacy – JSS College of Pharmacy, Mysore, JSS College of Pharmacy, Ooty
  * Department of Pharmaceutical Analysis
  * Department of Pharmaceutical Biotechnology
  * Department of Pharmaceutical Chemistry
  * Department of Pharmaceutics
  * Department of Pharmacognosy
  * Department of Pharmacology
  * Department of Pharmacy Practice
Faculty of Biomedical Sciences – Department of Allied Health Sciences
Faculty of Life Sciences – School of Life Sciences, Mysore, School of Life Sciences, Ooty
Faculty of Medicine – Department of Health System Management Studies
Faculty of Yoga – Department of Yoga

Ranking

The National Institutional Ranking Framework (NIRF) ranked JSS Academy of Higher Education & Research 54th overall in India and 33rd among universities in 2020. JSS College of Pharmacy was ranked 10 by the NIRF pharmacy ranking. QS World University Rankings ranked JSS Academy of Higher Education & Research top 5 rank in India under the subject “Pharmacy & Pharmacology” and ranked 201–250 rank globally under the subject “Pharmacy & Pharmacology” in 2021. Time Higher Education – World University Rankings ranked JSS Academy of Higher Education & Research top 3 rank in India and ranked 351–400 rank in global rankings 2022.

References

External links

Universities in Mysore
Deemed universities in Karnataka
Pharmacy schools in India
Medical colleges in Karnataka
Educational institutions established in 2008
2008 establishments in Karnataka